The Fayette National Bank Building, also known as the First National Bank Building or 21C Museum Hotel Lexington, is a historic 15-story high-rise in Lexington, Kentucky. The building was designed by the prominent architecture firm McKim, Mead & White and built by the George A. Fuller Company from 1913 to 1914. It was added to the National Register of Historic Places on February 27, 1980.

In 2016 the building was converted into a 21c Museum Hotel. The building was reconfigured into 88 hotel rooms, a restaurant and museum space. Renovations were expected to cost in excess of $43 million. The hotel opened in December of 2016. It was then inducted into Historic Hotels of America, the official program of the National Trust for Historic Preservation, in 2019.

See also 
 Higgins Block (Lexington, Kentucky), an adjacent building
 National Register of Historic Places listings in Fayette County, Kentucky

References

External links

21c Museum Hotels: Future Projects

Skyscraper office buildings in Lexington, Kentucky
National Register of Historic Places in Lexington, Kentucky
Bank buildings on the National Register of Historic Places in Kentucky
Commercial buildings completed in 1914
1914 establishments in Kentucky
Hotel buildings on the National Register of Historic Places in Kentucky
Office buildings on the National Register of Historic Places
Beaux-Arts architecture in Kentucky
Historic Hotels of America
Individually listed contributing properties to historic districts on the National Register in Kentucky